Riculorampha ancyloides is a moth of the family Tortricidae. It is found in southern Florida.

The length of the forewings is 3.5-4.5 mm for males and 4–5 mm for females.

The larvae feed on the fruit of Persea borbonia.

External links
 Images
 A new genus and species of Grapholitini (Lepidoptera, Tortricidae) from Florida, U.S.A.

Olethreutinae
Moths described in 2009